Kragra is a rural locality in the Western Downs Region, Queensland, Australia.

Kragra's postcode is 4413.

Geography 
The ridgline of the Great Dividing Range roughly bounds Kragra to the south. Part of the Koko State Forest is in the north of the locality; the state forest extends into neighbouring Hawkwood. Part of the Jarrah State Forest is in the south-east of the locality, extending into neighbouring Durah.

Apart from the state forests, the predominant land use is grazing on native vegetation.

History
Kragra Provisional School opened on 18 July 1955. It closed on 31 December 1974.

Economy 
There are a number of homesteads in the locality:

 Aqua Downs
 Araluen
 Bawnduggi
 Glenroy
 Koala
 Kragra
 Lismore
 Ormonde
 Overstone
 Rawdenvale
 Wambalano
 Wonga Hills

Education 
There are no schools in Kragra. The nearest primary school is Monogorilby State School in Monogorilby to the east. There are no nearby secondary schools; distance education or boarding school would be options.

References

Further reading 

 
 

Western Downs Region
Localities in Queensland